Eucalyptus griffithsii, commonly known as Griffith's grey gum, is a species of mallee or tree that is endemic to Western Australia. It has smooth grey to whitish bark, sometimes with rough, loose fibrous bark near the base of the trunk, lance-shaped adult leaves, flower buds in groups of three, white flowers and conical to cup-shaped fruit.

Description
It has smooth grey to whitish bark, sometimes with rough, fibrous or scaly bark covering the bottom . Flowering occurs between September and December or between January and March and the flowers are white.

Taxonomy and naming
Eucalyptus griffithsii was first formally described in 1911 by Joseph Maiden in the Journal of the Natural History and Science Society of Western Australia. The specific epithet (griffithsii) honours John Moore Griffiths for his interest in the work of Maiden over "nearly thirty years".

Distribution and habitat
Griffith's grey gum grows on low-lying flats and on rocky hillsides in the Goldfields-Esperance region of Western Australia between Kalgoorlie and Norseman where it grows in loamy-gravelly soils.

Conservation status
This mallee is classified as "not threatened" by the Western Australian Government Department of Parks and Wildlife.

See also
List of Eucalyptus species

References

Eucalypts of Western Australia
griffithsii
Myrtales of Australia
Plants described in 1911
Taxa named by Joseph Maiden